The main aspects of maternal health are prenatal care, post-natal care, family planning and preconception.

Rwanda has successfully institutionalised results-based financing (RBF) to improve prenatal care in several of the country's provinces.

Institutional Delivery 

Institutional delivery helps to reduce infant mortality rate. According to UNICEF, institutional delivery coverage is 69% in 2006-2010 in Rwanda.

Notes

Health in Rwanda
Rwanda
Women in Rwanda